An 2017 Bloc Québécois leadership election was held on March 14, 2017 to choose a successor to Gilles Duceppe, who resigned on October 22, 2015 after the 2015 Canadian federal election. Rhéal Fortin, MP for Rivière-du-Nord, had been serving as interim leader since Duceppe's resignation. The election was initially scheduled for April 22, 2017 but ended on March 14, 2017 at the end of the nomination period, because there was only one candidate. Ouellet's tenure was controversial due to her staunch separatist views, and, following a leadership vote, she was forced to resign in June 2018.

Timeline
October 19, 2015 - 2015 federal election results in the BQ winning 10 seats, up from the 2 it had when parliament dissolved; however, Duceppe fails to win a seat in Laurier—Sainte-Marie again.
October 22, 2015 - Duceppe resigns as party leader. Rhéal Fortin (MP for Rivière-du-Nord) is appointed interim leader.
February 2016 - A motion by MPs Xavier Barsalou-Duval and Mario Beaulieu challenging the right of interim leader Fortin to run for permanent leader is defeated by the parliamentary caucus by 5 votes to 4 with Fortin absenting himself from the vote.
December 7, 2016 - Interim leader Rhéal Fortin (MP for  Rivière-du-Nord) announces that he will not seek permanent leadership of the party.
February 4, 2017 - The general council of the BQ adopts the election rules and starts the election period.
February 4, 2017 - Nomination period opens.
March 14, 2017 - Nomination period ends. One candidate, Martine Ouellet fulfilled the nomination requirements.
March 18, 2017 - Martine Ouellet officially acclaimed as the next leader of the Bloc Québécois.

Candidate 
Martine Ouellet, engineer, Parti Québécois MNA for Vachon (2010–present), former Quebec Minister of Natural Resources and Wildlife (2012-2014), placed third in 2015 and 2016 Parti Québécois leadership elections. She announced her intention of running on February 5, 2017. She became candidate on March 12, 2017.
Supporters: Xavier Barsalou-Duval, MP for Pierre-Boucher—Les Patriotes—Verchères (2015–present); Catherine Bouchard-Tremblay, 2016 Option nationale provincial candidate in Chicoutimi; Michel Boudrias, MP for Terrebonne (2015–present); Claude Cousineau, MNA for Bertrand (1998–present); Marilène Gill, MP for Manicouagan (2015–present); Simon Marcil, MP for Mirabel; Gilbert Paquette, former MNA for Rosemont (1976-1985) and minister (1982-1984), 2015 BQ candidate in LaSalle—Émard—Verdun; Monique Pauzé, MP for Repentigny (2015–present); Sophie Stanké, 2015 BQ candidate in Châteauguay—Lacolle; Gabriel Ste-Marie, MP for Joliette (2015–present); Denis Trudel, 2015 BQ candidate in Longueuil—Saint-Hubert.
Campaign website: martineouellet.quebec

Results
Being the only candidate, Martine Ouellet won the election by default at the end of the nomination period, on March 14, 2017. She was officially named leader on March 18, 2017.

Disqualified candidate
Félix Pinel, teacher, 2015 BQ candidate in Rivière-des-Mille-Îles. He announced his intention of running on February 1, 2017. He did not obtain the required number of signatures before the end of the nomination period and thus he did not become a candidate.
Campaign website: felixpinelQc

Declined
Xavier Barsalou-Duval, MP for Pierre-Boucher—Les Patriotes—Verchères (2015–present), president of the BQ's youth wing Forum jeunesse du Bloc Québécois (2011-2015)
Mario Beaulieu, BQ party president (2014–present), former leader of the BQ (2014-2015), MP for La Pointe-de-l'Île (2015–present), leader of the Société Saint-Jean-Baptiste (2009–2014).
Rhéal Fortin, interim leader of the BQ (2015–present), MP for  Rivière-du-Nord (2015–present), lawyer.
Catherine Fournier, BQ candidate in Montarville (2015), placed second, economist by profession.
Denis Trudel, BQ candidate in Longueuil—Saint-Hubert (2015), placed third, comedian by profession.

References

External links
 Élection à la chefferie du Bloc Québécois (in French), Official page of the leadership election, Bloc Québécois
 Elections Canada, Information on Leadership Contests, Bloc Québécois

2017
2017 elections in Canada
2017 in Quebec
Bloc Québécois leadership election